José Corti is a bookshop and publishing house located in Paris, France, and was founded in 1925.

It is named after its founder, José Corticchiato (14 January 1895 – 25 December 1984). José Corticchiato started his business by publishing the work of his surrealist friends that included the founder André Breton, Paul Éluard, and Louis Aragon.

José Corti's bookshop is located in the Latin Quarter in Paris, at 11 Rue Médicis, 75006 Paris (VIème).

The firm was the lifelong publisher of French author Julien Gracq, and owns the publishing rights to Jan Potocki's masterpiece The Manuscript Found in Saragossa.

At the end of 2016, the bookshop at 11 rue de Médicis closed. It reopened in February 2017 under the name "Librairie des éditeurs associés", which still houses the Corti publishing collection, as well as other independent publishers.

In 2023, Marie de Quatrebarbes and Maël Guesdon took over the management of the house.

See also
 Books in France

External links 
 
 José Corti, sur le site de l'INA
 José Corti, la marche hors du temps. Entretien avec Bertrand Fillaudeau

References 

Independent bookstores
Bookstores of France
Book publishing companies of France
Retail companies established in 1925
Publishing companies established in 1925
French companies established in 1925
Companies based in Paris